Canis cedazoensis is an extinct species of smaller canid which was endemic to North America during the Pleistocene epoch, 1.8 Ma—300,000 years ago.

The morphology and dentition of C. cedazoensis suggests a jackal-like animal that was more hypercarnivorous than any current jackal. C. cedazoensis is close in size to the living golden jackal. It' appears to form an endemic clade with Canis thooides and Canis feneus, and is possibly descended from Canis lepophagus.

C. cedazoensis would have shared its habitat with both Armbruster's wolf and the dire wolf for approximately 1.8 million years before becoming extinct. Other competitors would have been the sabretooth cats Smilodon and Homotherium.

References

Wolves
Prehistoric canines
Prehistoric mammals of North America
Pliocene carnivorans
Pleistocene carnivorans
Pliocene first appearances
Pleistocene species extinctions
Fossil taxa described in 1975